Nicu Constantin (31 July 1939 – 15 September 2009) was a Romanian actor.

Films
 The Prophecy: Forsaken (2005)
 
  (1988)
 
  (1984)
  (1981)
  (1981)
  (1981)
  (1979)
  (1975) (TV)
  (1968)
  (1967)

References

External links

1938 births
2009 deaths
20th-century Romanian male actors
21st-century Romanian male actors
Romanian male film actors